Adelardo Covarsí (Badajoz, 24 April 1885 – Badajoz, 26 August 1951) was a Spanish painter active in Badajoz.

1885 births
1951 deaths
20th-century Spanish painters
20th-century Spanish male artists
Spanish male painters